John Hill (June 10, 1821 – July 24, 1884) was an American clerk, bookkeeper, merchant and Republican Party politician who represented  from 1867 to 1873, and  from 1881 to 1883.

Biography
Born in Catskill, New York, Hill attended private schools as a child. He was employed as a bank clerk and learned bookkeeping in Catskill. He moved to Boonton, New Jersey in 1845 and was employed as a bookkeeper and paymaster. He later engaged in mercantile pursuits, was postmaster of Boonton from 1849 to 1853, was a member of the town committee from 1852 to 1856 and was Justice of the Peace from 1856 to 1861. During the Civil War, Hill took an active part in raising troops for the Union Army. He served in the New Jersey General Assembly in 1861, 1862 and 1866, serving as Speaker of the House in the last year, was an unsuccessful candidate for the New Jersey Senate in 1862 and was again a member of the town committee from 1863 to 1867.

He was elected a Republican to the United States House of Representatives in 1866, serving from 1867 to 1873. There, Hill was chairman of the Committee on Expenditures in the Department of the Interior from 1871 to 1873. He was a delegate to the 1868 Republican National Convention and resumed mercantile pursuits from 1873 to 1876 when he retired. He served in the New Jersey Senate from 1875 to 1877 and was elected back to the United States House of Representatives in 1880, serving again from 1881 to 1883, not being a candidate for renomination in 1882. Hill died in Boonton on July 24, 1884 and was interred in Boonton Cemetery in Boonton.

External links

John Hill at The Political Graveyard

1821 births
1884 deaths
Speakers of the New Jersey General Assembly
Republican Party members of the New Jersey General Assembly
Republican Party New Jersey state senators
New Jersey postmasters
Paymasters
People from Boonton, New Jersey
People from the Catskills
People of New Jersey in the American Civil War
Politicians from Morris County, New Jersey
Burials in New Jersey
Republican Party members of the United States House of Representatives from New Jersey
19th-century American politicians
People from Catskill, New York